Breaker Morant: A Play in Two Acts is a significant Australian play written by Kenneth G. Ross, centred on the court-martial and the last days of Lieutenant Harry "Breaker" Morant (1864–1902) of the Bushveldt Carbineers (BVC), that was first performed at the Athenaeum Theatre, in Melbourne, Victoria, Australia, on Thursday, 2 February 1978, by the Melbourne Theatre Company.

Described at the time as an "interesting, though underwritten biographical study", the first performance of the play was directed and designed by John Sumner, the founding director of the Melbourne Theatre Company.

First performance 
The cast of the first performance of the play, directed and designed by John Sumner, on 2 February 1978 were:
 Lieutenant Harry (Breaker) Morant — Terence Donovan
 Lieutenant George Witton — Gary Day
 Lieutenant Peter Handcock — John Stanton
 First Interrogator; President of the Court-Martial; Lieutenant-Colonel Henry Cuthbert Denny (1858-?) — Barry Hill
 Second Interrogator; Dr. Johnson; Officer — Edward Hepple
 Third Interrogator; Mr. Robinson; Officer; Colonel Hamilton — Anthony Hawkins
 Major James Francis Thomas — Jonathan Hardy
 Major Bolton — Gerard Maguire
 Lord Kitchener — Simon Chilvers
 Sgt-Major Drummitt; Sergeant — Rob Harrison
 Trooper; Trooper Botha; Trooper — Gary Down
 Corporal; Captain Taylor; Corporal — Michael Edgar
 Trooper; Corporal Sharp; Trooper — Roy Baldwin
 Trooper; Van Rooyan; Trooper — Ian Suddards
 Trooper; Officer; Trooper — Peter Dunn
 Officer — Detlef Bauer
 Trooper — Michael Morrell

Review of first performance

Conversion to a movie 
The script of Ross's play was almost immediately converted into the screenplay for Bruce Beresford's 1980 film Breaker Morant.

The screenplay of the film, to which Ross had made a considerable contribution as a writer (i.e., in addition to his stage play having been the inspiration and basis for the screenplay), was nominated for the 1981 Academy Award for Best Writing, Screenplay Based on Material from Another Medium.

See also
 Breaker Morant
 Breaker Morant (film)
 Court martial of Breaker Morant

Notes

References
 Ross, Kenneth, Breaker Morant: A Play in Two Acts, Edward Arnold, (Melbourne), 1979. 
 Jillett, N. (ed),  "Arts/Entertainment: Briefly: Plays for Stage and Screen", The Age, 28 June 1978, p. 2., col.F. (Refers to Ross waiting to hear of the outcome of two definite offers: a Broadway production of his play "Don't Piddle Against the Wind", and the conversion of his play into a film either for cinema or for television.)
 Childs, K. (ed), "Weekender: Living Out: Theatre: ‘Breaker Morant’ ", The Age, 24 February 1978, p. 7., col.C; 3 March 1978, p. 9., col.D.
'Villains or Victims' in Australian War Memorial, Wartime, Issue No. 18, 2002, pp. 12–16.
Wilcox, Craig. 'Ned Kelly in Khaki', in The Weekend Australian Magazine, 23-24 Feb, 2002, pp. 20–22.

External links
 Australians at War: Major Thomas Defended Breaker Morant
 Personal Histories: Boer War & WW1: James Francis Thomas - The Man Who Defended Breaker Morant
 Fox, Frank, "The Bushveldt Carbineers: Letter to the Editor", The (Adelaide) Advertiser, (Wednesday, 2 July 1902), p.6, Col.I.
 "The Court-Martialled Australians: How Morant and Handcock Died: Letter From Their Warder", The Argus, (Thursday, 3 April 1902), p.5, col.C.
 Rawson, R., "Fine acting, set make strong defense against 'Breaker's' flaws", Pittsburgh Post-Gazette, (Wednesday, 13 November 2002), p.E-4.  
 Ross, Kenneth, "The truth about Harry", The Age, 26 February 2002. (Written on the hundredth anniversary of Morant's execution and the twenty-fourth anniversary of the first performance of his play, the same article appeared in the Sydney Morning Herald of 26 February 2002 in almost identical form)
 ABC Radio interview conducted by Simon Marnie with Andrew George and Mark Lee five days before the 13 April 2012 opening night.
 Fulton, A., "Soldiers on stage bring a touch of realism to Breaker tale", Sydney Morning Herald, Tuesday, 10 April 2012.

1978 plays
Australian plays adapted into films
Courts-martial in fiction